Christophe Horlaville (born 1 March 1969) is a French former professional footballer who had a 13-year career with Oissel, Rouen, Cannes, Guingamp, Le Havre, Port Vale (England), Metz, and Caen.

Whilst with Guingamp, he won the UEFA Intertoto Cup in 1996 and played in the final of the Coupe de France in 1997.

Career
Horlaville moved from local side Oissel to Arnaud Dos Santos's Rouen in 1988. The "Red Devils" finished 11th in Group A of Division 2 in 1988–89, then third in Group B in 1989–90, fifth in Group B in 1990–91, seventh in Group A in 1991–92, third in group B in 1992–93, and then 19th in the amalgamated Division 2 in 1993–94 as they suffered relegation. He left Stade Robert Diochon, and signed with Division 1 side Cannes in 1994. He was the club's top-scorer with 11 league goals in 1994–95 as they achieved a mid-table finish under Safet Sušić's stewardship. He then scored 12 league goals in 1995–96 to help steer Guy Lacombe's "Red Dragons" away from the relegation zone.

Horlaville joined Guingamp in 1996, and helped the Francis Smerecki's side to win the 1996 UEFA Intertoto Cup, scoring a goal in the first leg of the final against FC Rotor Volgograd. He also played at Parc des Princes in defeat to Nice in the final of the Coupe de France; he converted his penalty in the shoot-out, though Nice won 5–4. They failed to bring this success into the league though, finishing 12th in 1996–97. He departed Stade de Roudourou for Le Havre, who went on to finish eighth in 1997–98 under the stewardship of Denis Troch.

Horlaville played two months in the First Division of the English Football League on loan with John Rudge's Port Vale in the 1998–99 season. He made his debut at Vale Park as a 68th-minute substitute for Robin Berntsen on 14 November, in a 2–0 defeat to Sunderland. He made his first start for the "Valiants" seven days later in a 2–1 defeat to Oxford United at the Manor Ground. On 3 January, he played as a substitute in a 3–0 defeat to Liverpool in the FA Cup, in what was his last game for the club.

He returned to France to play for Joël Müller's Metz, who finished tenth in Division 1 in 1998–99. He then left Stade Saint-Symphorien to play for Caen. Pascal Théault led the club to a sixth-place finish in Division 2 in 1999–2000, before new boss Jean-Louis Gasset led Caen to 17th place in 2000–01. He left the professional game after leaving Stade Michel d'Ornano.

Personal life
He is the son of former France international Daniel Horlaville. He became a football player's agent after retiring from playing himself.

Career statistics

Honours
Guingamp
UEFA Intertoto Cup: 1996
Coupe de France runner-up: 1997

References

1969 births
Living people
Footballers from Normandy
Sportspeople from Seine-Maritime
Association football forwards
French footballers
CMS Oissel players
FC Rouen players
AS Cannes players
En Avant Guingamp players
Le Havre AC players
Port Vale F.C. players
FC Metz players
Stade Malherbe Caen players
Ligue 2 players
Ligue 1 players
English Football League players
French expatriate footballers
French expatriate sportspeople in England
Expatriate footballers in England